Dodge Demon may refer to 
 Dodge Dart Demon, a 2-door fastback coupe variant of the 1971-1972 Dodge Dart
 Dodge Demon (concept car), first shown in 2007
 Dodge Challenger SRT Demon, a highly modified variant of the  2018 Dodge Challenger

Demon
Rear-wheel-drive vehicles
Compact cars
Coupés
1970s cars